Goufes (previously ) is a village in Cyprus, 6 km northwest of Lefkoniko. It is under the de facto control of Northern Cyprus. As of 2011, it had a population of 100.

References

Communities in Famagusta District
Populated places in Gazimağusa District